Jagdev SIngh Kamalu is a politician from Punjab. He is MLA from Maur constituency (Number 95). He contested from Aam Aadmi Party in the year 2017 and won, defeating the incumbent MLA Janmeja Singh Sekhon. In 2021, Kamalu rebelled and moved to Indian National Congress.

References 

Former members of Aam Aadmi Party from Punjab
Indian National Congress politicians
Year of birth missing (living people)
Living people